The anterior jugular vein is a vein in the neck.

Structure 

The anterior jugular vein lies lateral to the cricothyroid ligament.
It begins near the hyoid bone by the confluence of several superficial veins from the submandibular region. Its tributaries are some laryngeal veins, and occasionally a small thyroid vein.
It descends between the median line and the anterior border of the sternocleidomastoid muscle, and, at the lower part of the neck, passes beneath that muscle to open into the termination of the external jugular vein, or, in some instances, into the subclavian vein.
Just above the sternum the two anterior jugular veins communicate by a transverse trunk, the venous jugular arch, which receive tributaries from the inferior thyroid veins; each also communicates with the internal jugular.

There are no valves in this vein.

The pretracheal lymph nodes follow the anterior jugular vein on each side of the midline.

Variation 
The anterior jugular vein varies considerably in size, bearing usually an inverse proportion to the external jugular. Most frequently, there are two anterior jugulars, a right and left. However, there is sometimes only one.

A duplicate anterior jugular vein may be present on one side, which may cross over the midline.

Clinical significance

Ultrasound 
The anterior jugular vein, if present, is easily identified using ultrasound of the neck.

Tracheotomy 
The anterior jugular vein may be damaged during tracheotomy, causing significant bleeding. The significant variation in vein course, such as duplicate veins, creates this risk. Performing a midline incision helps to avoid the anterior jugular vein.

Additional images

References

Veins of the head and neck